Laurent Viaud (born 8 October 1969 in Nantes) is a French retired footballer who played as a midfielder.

Football career
After starting out professionally with Angers SCO in the second division, Viaud moved to AS Monaco FC, making his Ligue 1 debut on 23 July 1993 in a 0–1 away loss against FC Nantes. Gradually imposing himself in the starting XI, he contributed with 24 matches in the 1996–97 season as the club won the national title after nine years.

At almost 30, in January 1999, Viaud moved abroad, playing one 1/2 seasons with lowly Extremadura CF, one in each major division. He then returned to France with second level's Stade Lavallois, then went back to Spain, appearing for another modest side, Albacete Balompié, again in La Liga and the second level.

After one season with amateurs Olympique Saumur FC, Viaud retired from the game, eventually becoming a scout for Premier League club Liverpool.

References

External links

Stats at Liga de Fútbol Profesional 

TangoFoot profile 

1969 births
Living people
Footballers from Nantes
French footballers
Association football midfielders
Ligue 1 players
Ligue 2 players
Angers SCO players
AS Monaco FC players
Stade Rennais F.C. players
Stade Lavallois players
La Liga players
Segunda División players
CF Extremadura footballers
Albacete Balompié players
French expatriate footballers
Expatriate footballers in Spain
French expatriate sportspeople in Spain
Liverpool F.C. non-playing staff
Olympique Saumur FC players
Brittany international footballers